Roman Aleksandrovich Melnik (born 25 May 1977) is a former Russian football player.

References

1977 births
Living people
Russian footballers
FC Luch Vladivostok players
Russian Premier League players
FC Okean Nakhodka players
Association football forwards
FC Novokuznetsk players
FC Smena Komsomolsk-na-Amure players